Defending champion Diede de Groot defeated Yui Kamiji in the final, 6–4, 6–1 to win the women's singles wheelchair tennis title at the 2022 French Open. She completed the triple career Grand Slam with the win.

Seeds

Draw

Finals

References

External links
 Draw

Wheelchair Women's Singles
French Open, 2022 Women's Singles